Uwe Billerbeck (born 28 May 1970) is a German former gymnast. He competed in six events at the 1996 Summer Olympics.

References

External links
 

1970 births
Living people
German male artistic gymnasts
Olympic gymnasts of Germany
Gymnasts at the 1996 Summer Olympics
People from Esslingen am Neckar
Sportspeople from Stuttgart (region)